Born to Sing is a 1942 American feature film directed by Edward Ludwig starring Virginia Weidler and Ray McDonald.

Plot
Frank Eastman is a down-on-his-luck show tune composer. He wrote some music while in prison which was subsequently stolen by well-to-do show promoter Arthur Cartwright. When Eastman's teenage daughter Patsy befriends some boys her age who plead with Cartwright to get Eastman the credit he is due. Cartwright calls the police, claiming extortion.

When the boys are arrested, they are placed in the same paddy wagon as gangster Pete Detroit. Pete's gang frees them all.

Patsy and the boys decide they can prove Eastman is the true composer if they perform a show before Cartwright's show debuts. They recruit neighborhood children and teens to perform.

Cast

Reception
The film made $298,000 in the US and Canada and $245,000 elsewhere, making MGM a loss of $138,000.

References

External links
 
 Born to Sing at TCMDB
 
 

1942 films
Metro-Goldwyn-Mayer films
1940s English-language films
1942 musical films
Films with screenplays by Franz Schulz
Films directed by Edward Ludwig
Films scored by Lennie Hayton
American musical films
American black-and-white films
1940s American films